Events from the year 1735 in Russia

Incumbents
 Monarch – Anna

Events

  Treaty of Ganja
 Austro-Russian–Turkish War (1735–39)

Births

Deaths

References

1735 in Russia
Years of the 18th century in the Russian Empire